Rising Up is an EP by British heavy metal band Diamond Head released in 1992. The recording stems following Brian Tatler and Sean Harris partnering back again, now with Karl Wilcox on drums and Eddie Chaos on Bass, following a jam session with Metallica. Playing only new material, the band completed a small tour of UK clubs under the pseudonym Dead Reckoning. Following that the band entered the studio to record tracks for the 2-track 12" EP, which was available only at gigs and specialist record shops. The track 'Wild On The Streets' had its origins back in 1978, but it had never been completed or recorded.

Track listing

Notes
 Both tracks were later included on their following album Death and Progress, albeit Can't Help Myself had its name changed to I Can't Help Myself

Personnel
 Brian Tatler - guitars
 Sean Harris - vocals
 Karl Wilcox - drums
 Eddie Chaos - bass

External sites

1992 EPs